Walter Peintinger (born 24 May 1945) is an Austrian football manager and former player.

External links
 

1945 births
Living people
Austrian footballers
Austrian football managers
Association football midfielders